Guy Bertrand (born April 5, 1954) is a Canadian linguist and broadcast personality. 

He was born in Trois-Rivières, Quebec. A media language specialist, he has written the linguistic standards and practices for the French CBC services. His daily broadcasts are heard across Canada on Première Chaîne and Télévision de Radio-Canada.

Radio and Television Programmes 
Presently Aired:

 Phare Ouest (Vancouver – Radio, 2018- )
 Sur le vif (Ottawa – Radio, 2016- )
 Par ici l'info (Sherbrooke – Radio, 2018- )
 Des matins en or (Abitibi-Temiscamingue – Radio, 2013- )
 Le matin du Nord (Sudbury – Radio, 2009- )
 Matins sans frontières (Windsor – Radio, 2015- )
 Info-réveil (Rimouski – Radio, 2008- )
 Bon pied, bonne heure (Matane – Radio, 2008- )
 Le 6 à 9 (Saint-Boniface/Winnipeg – Radio, 2012- )
 Le café show (Edmonton – Radio, 2011- )
 Le réveil (Halifax – Radio, 2011- )
 Le réveil (Charlottetown – Radio, 2014- )
 L'heure de pointe - Acadie (Atlantic Provinces – Radio, 2013- )
 Point du jour (Regina – Radio, 2013- )
 Y a pas deux matins pareils (Toronto – Radio, 2013- )
 Capsule linguistique (Canada – Radio, 1994- )
 Les mots pour le dire (Montreal – Television, 2009- )

Past Broadcasts:

 Marina Orsini (Canada – Television, 2015–2019)
 C’est bien meilleur le matin (Montreal – Radio, 1998–2013)
 Pour le plaisir (Canada –  Television, 2007–2013)
 C'est ça la vie (Canada –   Television, 2012–2013)
 Des kiwis et des hommes (Canada – Television, 2010–2011)
 Style libre (Saguenay – Radio, 2017–2020)
 360 PM (Trois-Rivières – Radio, 2016–2020)
 C'est pas trop tôt en Estrie (Sherbrooke – Radio, 2016–2018)
 Le 15-18 (Montreal – Radio, 2013–2017)
 Café, boulot, Dodo (Saguenay – Radio, 2004–2017)
 Les voies du retour (Ottawa – Radio, 2013- 2016)
 Québec express (Quebec City – Radio, 1999–2001)
 Nulle part ailleurs (Ottawa – Radio, 1999–2001)
 Vivement samedi (Ottawa – Radio, 2001–2002)
 Au gré des jours (Sept-Iles – Radio, 2001–2005)
 Fréquence 90 (Ottawa – Radio, 2003–2004)
 Chez nous le matin (Trois-Rivieres – Radio, 2003–2011)
 Tour de piste (Canada – Radio, 2006-2006)
 Bonjour la Côte (Sept-Iles – Radio, 2006–2007)
 Les arts et les autres (Toronto – Radio, 2006–2007)
 Sonnez les matines (Matane – Radio, 2006–2008)
 Tam-Tam (international – Radio, 2007–2012)
 Radio-Réveil (Saint-Boniface/Winnipeg – Radio, 2008–2012)
 Le monde selon Mathieu (Ottawa – Radio, 2005–2013)
 Six pieds au-dessus de la mer (Vancouver – Radio, 2010–2012)
 La nuit qui bat (Canada – Radio, 2011–2012)
 Libre échange (Atlantic Provinces – Radio, 2011–2013)
 Capsule Radar (Canada – Radio, 1992–1994)
 CBV bonjour! (Quebec City – Radio, 1991)

Awards
 Prix Georges-Émile-Lapalme 2017 (Prix du Québec)

Other achievements
 Member of the jury – Dictée des Amériques (2002–2009)
 Member of the jury – Prix Francopub (2005–2017)
 Member of the jury – Prix Georges-Émile-Lapalme (2010)
 President of the jury – Prix Georges-Émile-Lapalme (2011)
 Member of the Scientific Committee – Franqus project (Université de Sherbrooke)
 Honorary President – Concours national de lecture (2008–2009)
 Author – Dictée Éric-Fournier (2009)
 Author – La grande dictée de la Saskatchewan (2010)

Published books
 400 capsules linguistiques (1999)
 400 capsules linguistiques II (2006)
 Pris au mot (2015)

External links
 Le Français au micro

1954 births
Linguists from Canada
Canadian translators
Canadian television personalities
People from Trois-Rivières
French Quebecers
Living people
CBC Radio hosts
Francophone Quebec people